Line M13, officially referred to as the M13 Söğütlüçeşme–Yenidoğan line, is a rapid transit line of the Istanbul Metro system, currently planned in the Asian part of Istanbul, Turkey.

The tender of this project was cancelled on January 3, 2018.

Stations

References

Istanbul Metro
Transport infrastructure under construction in Turkey